The Dutch Caribbean (historically known as the Dutch West Indies) are the territories, colonies, and countries, former and current, of the Dutch Empire and the Kingdom of the Netherlands in the Caribbean Sea. They are in the north and south-west of the Lesser Antilles archipelago.

Currently, it comprises the constituent countries of Aruba, Curaçao and Sint Maarten (CAS islands), and the special municipalities of Bonaire, Sint Eustatius and Saba (BES islands). The term "Dutch Caribbean" is sometimes also used for the Caribbean Netherlands, an entity consisting of the three special municipalities forming part of the constituent country of the Netherlands since 2010. The Dutch Caribbean has a population of 337,617 as of January 2019.

History

The islands in the Dutch Caribbean were, from 1815, part of the colonies  Curaçao and Dependencies (1815–1828) or Sint Eustatius and Dependencies (1815–1828), which were merged with the colony of Suriname (not considered part of the Dutch Caribbean, although it was on the Caribbean coast of Northeastern South America) and governed from Paramaribo until 1845, when all islands again became part of Curaçao and Dependencies.

In 1954, the islands became the country Netherlands Antilles (1954−2010). The autonomy of the Netherlands Antilles' island territories was stipulated in the Islands Regulation of the Netherlands Antilles. Initially the Netherlands Antilles consisted of four island territories: Aruba, Bonaire, Curaçao and the Windward Islands. The latter split into the Island Territories Saba, Sint Eustatius and Sint Maarten in 1983.

The island of Aruba seceded from the Netherlands Antilles in 1986 to become a separate constituent country of the Kingdom of the Netherlands, leaving five island territories within the Netherlands Antilles. This situation remained until the complete dissolution of the Netherlands Antilles as a unified political entity in 2010. In that year Curaçao and Sint Maarten became autonomous constituent countries within the Kingdom (like Aruba); while Bonaire, Sint Eustatius, and Saba became special municipalities of the Netherlands proper. The Netherlands proper is located in the European Union.

Geography
Geographically, the six entities of the Dutch Caribbean are clustered in two widely separated areas of the Caribbean.  
 Three are at the far northern end of the Leeward Islands--thus the far northern end of the Lesser Antilles.  From north to south, these are Sint Maarten (occupying roughly the southern half of the island of Saint Martin), Saba, and Sint Eustatius. 
 Three are just off the coast of Venezuela, at the far west end of the Leeward Antilles, which extend west from the south end of the Windward Islands--thus, they are at the southwest end of the Lesser Antilles. From west to east, they are Aruba, Curacao, and Bonaire.
Politically, each of the six entities of the Dutch Caribbean currently has one of two relationships with the Netherlands:
 Three have the status of being constituent countries of the Kingdom of the Netherlands
 Three have the status of being special municipalities of the Netherlands alone, as distinct from the Kingdom in its entirety.

Constituent countries

Three Caribbean polities are countries within the Kingdom of the Netherlands: Aruba, Curaçao, and Sint Maarten. The Netherlands is the fourth and largest constituent country in the Kingdom.

Sint Maarten comprises the southern half of the island of Saint Martin. The northern half of the island – the Collectivity of Saint Martin – is an overseas territory of France. Aruba and Curacao are located in the far south of the Caribbean being 30 kilometres and 65 kilometres from the coast of Venezuela.

Special municipalities

The three Caribbean islands that are special municipalities of the Netherlands alone are Bonaire, Sint Eustatius, and Saba. Collectively, these special municipalities of the Netherlands are also known as the "BES islands" or the Caribbean Netherlands. Bonaire is located in the far south of the Caribbean, being about 80 kilometres from the coast of Venezuela, whilst Saba is located about 50 kilometres south of Sint Maarten (where the highest mountain in the Netherlands, Mount Scenery, is located; 880 meters above sea level) and Sint Eustatius is located directly north of the Saint Kitts.

Comparison

Grouping of islands
The islands have also been informally grouped in the following ways.
Geographically, by location in the Lesser Antilles (in alphabetical order):
 ABC islands, for Aruba, Bonaire, and Curaçao (within the Leeward Antilles group)
 SSS islands, for Saba, Sint Eustatius, and Sint Maarten (within the Leeward Islands group)
Politically, by constitutional status (in order of population size):
 CAS islands, for Curaçao, Aruba, and Sint Maarten (constituent countries of the Kingdom of the Netherlands)
 BES islands, for Bonaire, Sint Eustatius, and Saba (special municipalities of the Netherlands)

See also
Central banks and currencies of the Caribbean
Dutch navy in the Caribbean
Curaçaoans in the Netherlands
Arubans in the Netherlands
Dutch nationality law

Notes

References

External links

 
Geography of the Caribbean
Regions of the Netherlands
Subdivisions of the Netherlands
 Dutch